Maarten Boudewijn Engwirda (born 2 June 1943) is a retired Dutch politician of the Democrats 66 (D66) party.

Decorations

References

External links

 
 

 

1943 births
Living people
Commanders of the Order of Orange-Nassau
Democrats 66 MEPs
Democrats 66 politicians
Dutch expatriates in Belgium
Dutch officials of the European Union
Knights of the Order of the Netherlands Lion
Leaders of the Democrats 66
Members of the Court of Audit (Netherlands)
Members of the House of Representatives (Netherlands)
MEPs for the Netherlands 1984–1989
MEPs for the Netherlands 1989–1994
MEPs for the Netherlands 1994–1999
Officers of the Order of Orange-Nassau
People from Leiden
People from Tilburg
University of Groningen alumni
20th-century Dutch civil servants
20th-century Dutch economists
20th-century Dutch politicians
21st-century Dutch civil servants
21st-century Dutch economists
21st-century Dutch politicians